Geőcze is a Hungarian surname. Notable people with the surname include:

Sarolta Geőcze (1862–1928), Hungarian women's rights activist and educator
Zoárd Geőcze (1873–1916), Hungarian mathematician

Hungarian-language surnames